Delina Ibrahimaj (born 23 December 1983) is an Albanian politician serving as Minister of Finance and Economy in Prime Minister Edi Rama's Cabinet since September 2021.

Early life 
Delina Ibrahimaj was born on 23 December 1983 in Tirana, Albania. She studied in Italy at the University of Rome Tor Vergata and Luigi Bocconi University for Finance and Economic Management.

Political career 
From 2005 to 2007, she was manager of the Albanian Distribution Association. In 2007–2010, she performed the duty of general manager in Urban Distribution.

In 2011–2015, she worked as an economist at the Bank of Albania and served as Senior Financial Officer on the Board of Tirana Express. In 2016, she was member of the Statistics Council, INSTAT, and in 2017 was a member of the Board of Directors of FED invest and a member of Social Insurance Institute.

In 2019, she served as Director General of Taxation. On 2 September 2021, she was appointed as Minister of Finance and Economy by the Prime Minister Edi Rama in new Cabinet Rama III after former Minister of Finance Anila Denaj was suspended.

References 

Economy ministers of Albania
1983 births
Living people
Government ministers of Albania
Women government ministers of Albania
21st-century Albanian politicians
Bocconi University alumni
University of Rome Tor Vergata alumni
Women economists
Albanian expatriates in Italy
Albanian economists
Socialist Party of Albania politicians
Politicians from Tirana
Finance ministers of Albania
Female finance ministers
21st-century Albanian women politicians